The Amazing New Electronic Pop Sound of Jean Jacques Perrey is the sixth studio album by French electronic musician Jean-Jacques Perrey, released in 1968 on the Vanguard Records label. It has been reissued several times.

Background
The penultimate song "Four, Three, Two, One" was made together with Billy Mure. The final track "Gypsy in Rio" is a homage to Spike Jones. In early 1996, the album was reissued.

Critical reception 

Billboard described it as "a fun album, which admirably accomplished [Perrey's] stated purpose: to show that electronic music need not be esoteric. He utilizes tapes and various apparatus to accomplish this." For the 1996 album reissue, the US magazine described the album as "a campy and entertaining 1968 solo project of synthesized blurps, bleats and solid-state noodling". 

AllMusic reviewer Richie Unterberger said that it "sounds like nothing so much as late-'60s instrumental 'mood' music albums as refracted through a slightly more ambitious, electronic lens. It's really not something you can put on again and again, but it's kind of fun nonetheless."

Track listing

Personnel
Adapted from the album's sleeve notes.
Jean-Jacques Perrey – instruments
Ed Friedner – engineering and special effects
Peter Bramley – artwork

Uses in other media 
"The Minuet of the Robots" was the soundtrack for the Muppet feature "Big Bird's Dance" on December 14, 1969 in The Ed Sullivan Show, accompanied by arrangements made by the CBS Studio Orchestra. In 2010, "Brazilian Flower" was used in a soccer commercial. Two pieces from this album were used in short films by David Lewandowsky: Going to the Store from 2011 used "The Little Ships", and Late for Meeting from 2013 used "The Mexican Cactus".

References

External links 
 The Amazing New Electronic Pop Sound Of Jean Jacques Perrey at Discogs

1968 albums
Jean-Jacques Perrey albums
Vanguard Records albums